Feruz can refer to:

 Feruz, Çorum
 a pen name of Muhammad Rahim Khan II of Khiva